Umshiang Double-Decker Root Bridge is a living root bridge in Meghalya, India. It can be reached via trekking 45 km from Cherapunji. The trek is 6500 steps.  There is also a waterfall nearby.

Due to tourism, the health of the root bridge has degraded. Meghalaya presented the root bridge at its 70th Republic Day ceremony. A replica of the bridge has been made in Nangrighat in Cherrapunji to present the Khansi and Jaintia people's craft of building bridges from the secondary roots of trees. These living bridges are grown  from a special type of rubber tree. As the roots grow, so the strength of the bridge increases. The root bridges are honoured as the Tajmahal of Meghalaya. They take around 25 years to grow and operate, but can carry the weight of 50 people and go on functioning for 500 years.

References 

Tourist attractions in Meghalaya
Bridges in India